A business necessity is a legitimate business purpose that justifies an employment decision as effective and needed to optimally achieve the organization's goals and ensure that operations run safely and efficiently. This is often presented as a defense of an employment decision that is questioned because it was found to cause disparate impact.

References

Business terms